Supermax is  a type of high-security prison or prison unit.

Supermax may also refer to
 Supermax (band), a band
 Supermax (Malaysia), a Malaysian company
 Supermax (TV channel), a Czech former TV channel
 Supermax (Brazilian TV series), a Brazilian television series
 Supermax (Spanish TV series), a Spanish reality television series
 ADX Florence or Supermax, a specific prison facility in Fremont County, Colorado, U.S.
 Supermax contract, the popular name of a contract that can be offered to certain elite NBA players 
 Super Max, nickname of Formula One driver Max Verstappen and the title of a song about him.

See also 
 Maximum Security (disambiguation)
 Super Max, a planned Green Arrow superhero film